Johann Hofstätter (12 January 1913 – 27 July 1996) was an Austrian footballer and coach.

References

External links

 DFB

1913 births
1996 deaths
Austrian footballers
German footballers
Germany international footballers
Association football midfielders
SK Rapid Wien players
Austrian football managers
1. Simmeringer SC managers
First Vienna FC managers